Easton Court railway station was a station in Little Hereford, Herefordshire, England. The station opened on 1 August 1861 as the only intermediate stop on the Tenbury Railway. It was removed from the passenger timetable in October 1862 due to a lack of traffic.

The station appeared in some timetables as "Easton Court for Little Hereford". It closed on 31 July 1961, the same date as the closure of the former Tenbury Railway.

References

Further reading

Disused railway stations in Herefordshire
Railway stations in Great Britain opened in 1861
Railway stations in Great Britain closed in 1961
Former Great Western Railway stations